Andrej Vučić is a senior official of the Serbian Progressive Party, businessman, previously an executive of the Institute for Manufacturing Banknotes and Coins of the National Bank of Serbia and a board member of KK Crvena zvezda. He is also the brother of Serbian president Aleksandar Vučić.

Biography 
Andrej Vučić is a son of Angelina and Anđelko Vučić, and the younger brother of Aleksandar Vučić, the President of Serbia.

While working at the Institute for Manufacturing Banknotes and Coins, Andrej Vučić's identity card and his signature were "stolen" and "used" to incorporate the company Asomakum. Asomakum company was a subject of discussions in the National Assembly of the Republic of Serbia about frauds and subject to official prosecutorial decision in Belgrade curt in 2011 due to taxes avoidance. Andrej Vučić filed a claim for stolen identity.

In September 2014, during Pride parade in Belgrade, a group of gendarmes physically attacked Andrej Vučić and his bodyguards.

In September 2015 five members of United States Congress (Eddie Bernice Johnson, Carlos Curbelo, Scott Perry, Adam Kinzinger, and Zoe Lofgren) have informed Vice President of the United States Joseph Biden that Andrej Vučić is leading a group that smears media freedom in Serbia.

Former Mayor of Belgrade, Siniša Mali, claimed that his candidature for the post of mayor was the idea of Andrej Vučić.

Sources 

Year of birth missing (living people)
Living people
Politicians from Belgrade
Serbian Progressive Party politicians
Businesspeople from Belgrade
KK Crvena Zvezda executives